Paolo Pizzetti (July 24, 1860 – April 14, 1918) was an Italian geodesist, astronomer, geophysicist and mathematician. He studied engineering in Rome, graduating in 1880. He remained in Rome and assisted Giuseppe Pisati and Enrico Pucci with their absolute determination of gravity. In 1886, he became Associate Professor of Geodesy at the University of Genoa where he stayed until becoming Professor of Geodesy at the University of Pisa in 1900. He stayed in Pisa until his death in 1918.

He wrote Höhere Geodäsie (Higher Geodesy) as well as many important works on the theory of errors. He was a member of Accademia dei Lincei and the academy in Turin. He was an Invited Speaker of the ICM in 1908 at Rome. A crater on the far side of the moon, Pizzetti, is named after him.

See also
Feodosy Krasovsky
Karl Friedrich Küstner
Alexander Ross Clarke
John Fillmore Hayford

References

External links
Höhere Geodäsie by Paolo Pizzetti

Italian geodesists
19th-century Italian physicists
1860 births
1918 deaths
Academic staff of the University of Pisa
20th-century Italian physicists